Adult Contemporary is a chart published by Billboard ranking the top-performing songs in the United States in the adult contemporary music (AC) market.  In 2002, nine different songs topped the chart in 52 issues of the magazine, based on weekly airplay data from radio stations compiled by Nielsen Broadcast Data Systems.

In the first issue of Billboard of the new year, the number one song was "Simple Things", a collaboration between pianist Jim Brickman and singer Rebecca Lynn Howard, which moved into the top spot that week.  Unusually, despite going all the way to number one on the AC listing, the song did not enter Billboards all-genre chart, the Hot 100, at all.  Brickman, whose recordings mix pop and New-age music, has regularly placed songs on the AC chart since the 1990s, but "Valentine", which reached number 50 in 1997, is his only song ever to cross over to the Hot 100.  After one week in the top spot, "Simple Things" was displaced by "Hero" by Enrique Iglesias, which spent eleven weeks at number one, adding to the four which it had accumulated at the end of 2001.

In the issue of Billboard dated March 30, Canadian singer Celine Dion, one of the most successful pop/AC acts of all time, reached number one with "A New Day Has Come", the lead single from her first album after a hiatus from the music business during which she gave birth to her first child.  The song would go on to hold the top spot for 21 consecutive weeks, breaking the record for the highest total number of weeks atop the AC chart previously shared by "You'll Be in My Heart" by Phil Collins (1999) and Dion's own "Because You Loved Me" (1996), both of which spent 19 weeks at number one.  Such lengthy spells in the top spot would become a feature of the AC chart in the 21st century: by 2019 a further eight songs had spent 20 or more weeks at number one.  None of 2002's AC chart-toppers reached number one on the Hot 100; in the fall "Do It for Love" by Hall & Oates became the second song of the year to top the AC listing without entering the Hot 100 at all.  The number one position on the Hot 100 was largely dominated in 2002 by R&B and hip-hop artists such as Ashanti and Nelly.  The only act with more than one AC number one during the year was vocalist Josh Groban, who topped the chart for two weeks with "To Where You Are" in August and returned to the top spot in the final issue of Billboard of the year with his rendition of the 19th century Christmas song "O Holy Night".

Chart history

See also
2002 in music
List of artists who reached number one on the U.S. Adult Contemporary chart

References

2002
2002 in American music
2002 record charts